Pierre Cahuzac (3 July 1927 – 31 August 2003) was a French football player and manager who played as a midfielder. As a manager, he led SC Bastia to the 1978 UEFA Cup Final.

His grandson Yannick Cahuzac is a professional footballer.

References
 Profile on French federation official site

1927 births
2003 deaths
French footballers
France international footballers
Association football midfielders
Ligue 1 players
French football managers
Gazélec Ajaccio managers
SC Bastia managers
Toulouse FC managers
Olympique de Marseille managers
AS Béziers Hérault (football) players
Sportspeople from Hérault
Footballers from Occitania (administrative region)